Akhil Pasreja, known mononymously as Akhil, is an Indian playback singer, songwriter and music performer. He made his Bollywood singing debut in Luka Chuppi (2019). He was born in an Arora family in Jalandhar, Punjab.

Career 

In February 2014, his first single "Muradaan " was released under HSR Entertainment (formerly Yellow Music). He previously sang a song titled "Pee Lain De" in 2012 though.

His Punjabi-language single "Khaab", which was released in February 2016 became popular on YouTube. In February 2019, a Hindi remake of Khaab, Duniyaa, was recorded for the film Luka Chuppi.

In June 2016, he collaborated with music composer "Manni Sandhu" for a single titled "Gani" for his album Welcome to the Future, released by Speed Records. A year later, he released the single "Life" starring Bollywood actress Adah Sharma.

In 2017 he was awarded "Best Breakthrough Act" at the Brit Asia TV Music Awards.

Discography

Film Songs

Singles

References

External links 

 Akhil on Gaana
 Akhil on iTunes
 Akhil on Hungama.com
 

Living people
21st-century Indian male actors
Bhangra (music) musicians
Indian male songwriters
Year of birth missing (living people)